The following is a list of the ten congressional districts in the U.S. state of Washington.
This article partially describes districts prior to the 2012 redistricting.

At large
From the time that Washington Territory was formed in 1853, through statehood in 1889, Washington Territory elected an at-large non-voting Delegate to the United States House of Representatives. At different times in its history, the state of Washington has also elected one or more representatives At-large statewide.

Current districts and representatives
List of members of the United States House delegation from Washington, their terms, their district boundaries, and the district political ratings according to the CPVI. The delegation has a total of 10 members, including 8 Democrats and 2 Republicans.

Historical and present district boundaries
Table of United States congressional district boundary maps in the State of Washington, presented chronologically. All redistricting events that took place in Washington between 1973 and 2013 are shown.

State redistricting procedures
Washington is one of 22 states that do not give direct control of redistricting to the state's legislature.

The state's congressional districts are determined by a four-member Washington State Redistricting Commission that is appointed every ten years. Two members are appointed by both of the state's legislative branches, with the majority leader and minority leader from each selecting one person. The four appointed members then vote to appoint a fifth, non-partisan chairperson that cannot vote. The commission is disbanded once they have approved a redistricting plan.

In 1981 Republicans attempted to gerrymander Tom Foley's fifth district by splitting Spokane (the district's main population center) into two districts, but this was vetoed by Governor John Spellman. After they redrew districts in 1982, a federal court threw out the map for excessive population variation. New maps were drawn in 1983 by a five-member commission appointed by the legislature to avoid continued deadlock under a court-imposed deadline; the legislature had historically often failed to redistrict. In 1983, the voters approved a ballot measure to amend the state constitution to permanently establish a redistricting commission. The first commission created under the changes completed their work as part of the 1991 redistricting.

See also

List of United States congressional districts

References

External links
Washington State Redistricting Commission
Find your new congressional district: a searchable map, Seattle Times, January 13, 2012